Chongwe is a constituency of the National Assembly of Zambia. It covers the town of Chongwe in Chongwe District of Lusaka Province.

List of MPs

Election results

2011 by-election

References

Constituencies of the National Assembly of Zambia
1983 establishments in Zambia
Constituencies established in 1983